Habib ur Rahman is an Arabic male given name, meaning friend of the Merciful One. It may refer to:

Hakim Habibur Rahman (1881–1947), Unani physician, litterateur, journalist, politician and chronicler in Dhaka, (now Bangladesh)
Habib ur Rahman (Indian National Army officer) (1913–1978), officer of the British Indian Army and the Indian National Army
Habibur Rahman Kandhalvi (1924–1991), Pakistani Islamic scholar and author
Muhammad Habibur Rahman (1928–2014), chief justice of Bangladesh Supreme Court
Habib Rahman (detainee) (born ca. 1982), Afghan held in Guantanamo
Habibur Rehman Mondal (born 1986), Indian footballer
Habib-ur-Rehman (actor) (1929–2016), Pakistani film actor, director, producer and television actor
Habib Rahman (architect) (1915–1995), Indian architect
Habibur Rahman (cricketer) (born 1987), Bangladeshi cricketer
Habibur Rehman (field hockey) (born 1925), Pakistani Olympic hockey player
Habib ur Rahman (politician) (born 1948), Pakistani politician
Habib Rahman (weightlifter) (born 1933), Pakistani Olympic weightlifter
Habibur Rahman (Bogra politician) (1931–2002), Bangladesh Nationalist Party politician
Habibur Rahman (Jamaat-e-Islami politician) (c. 1935–2010)
Habibur Rahman (poet) (1923–1976), Bangladeshi journalist, poet and writer
Habibur Rahman (Chuadanga politician)
Habibur Rahman (Indian politician) (died 2016), Indian teacher and politician from West Bengal
Habibur Rahman (police officer) (born 1967), Bangladeshi police officer
Habiburrahman Shakir (1903-1975), Tatar imam, theologian, publisher

See also 
Habib
Rahman (name)

Arabic masculine given names